Francesco Pisani (died 1572) was a Roman Catholic prelate who served as Archbishop (Personal Title) of Chioggia (1569–1572) and Archbishop of Naxos (1564–1569).

Biography
On 15 December 1564, Francesco Pisani was appointed during the papacy of Pope Pius IV as Archbishop of Naxos.
On 19 July 1569, he was appointed during the papacy of Pope Pius V as Archbishop (Personal Title) of Chioggia.
He served as Bishop of Chioggia until his death on 8 February 1572.

Episcopal succession
While bishop, he was the principal consecrator of: 
Miler Magrath, Bishop of Down and Connor (1565);
Nicolas Ugrinovich, Bishop of Smederevo (1565);
Beatus di Porta, Bishop of Chur (1565);
Luca Antonio Resta, Bishop of Castro di Puglia (1565);
and the principal co-consecrator of: 
Aloysius Delfino, Bishop of Canea (1565).

References

External links and additional sources
 (for Chronology of Bishops) 
 (for Chronology of Bishops) 
 (for Chronology of Bishops) 
 (for Chronology of Bishops) 

16th-century Italian Roman Catholic archbishops
Bishops appointed by Pope Pius IV
Bishops appointed by Pope Pius V
1572 deaths
Roman Catholic archbishops of Naxos
16th-century Roman Catholic bishops in the Republic of Venice